Maroons are descendants of Africans in the Americas who formed settlements away from New World chattel slavery.

Maroons may also refer to:

Sports 
 Maroons FC, a Ugandan football club
 Butte Central Catholic High School's athletic teams, Montana, U.S.
 Champaign Central High School's athletic teams, Illinois, U.S.
 Chatham Maroons, a Canadian junior ice hockey team
 Chicago Maroons, the intercollegiate sports teams of the University of Chicago, U.S.
 Clinton High School (Clinton, Illinois)'s athletic teams, Illinois, U.S.
 Gżira United F.C., Malta, nicknamed the Maroons
 Holland Christian High School(Michigan)'s athletic teams, Michigan, U.S.
 Kenosha Maroons, an American football team in 1924
 Kandurata Maroons, is Sri Lankan cricket team 
 Lachine Maroons, a Canadian junior ice hockey team
 Mississippi State University's athletic teams, U.S.

 Moline High School's athletic teams, Illinois, U.S.
 Montreal Maroons, a Canadian ice hockey team 1924–1938
 Moose Jaw Maroons, a Canadian minor-league ice hockey team 1926–28
 Pottsville Maroons, an American football team 1925–1928
 Ridgewood High School (New Jersey)'s athletic teams, U.S.
 Roanoke Maroons, the athletic teams of Roanoke College, U.S.
 Queensland rugby league team, Australia, nicknamed the Maroons
 St. Louis Maroons/Indianapolis Hoosiers, an American baseball club 1884–1886
 Toledo Maroons, an American football team 1922–1923
 UP Fighting Maroons, the athletic teams of the University of the Philippines
Westfort Maroons, a Canadian junior ice hockey team 1993–2006
 Winnipeg Maroons, a Canadian minor League baseball team 1902–1942
 Winnipeg Maroons (ice hockey), Canada, 1960s

Other uses
Maroons (album), a 1992 album by Geri Allen
 Maroons (hip hop group), former name of Lateef and the Chief, a hip-hop group

See also
 
 Maroon (disambiguation)
 Great Dismal Swamp maroons
 Jamaican Maroons
 Jamaican Maroons in Sierra Leone